The Minnesota Northern Railroad  is a Class III shortline railroad that operates over  of track in northwestern Minnesota. The railroad is co-owned by KBN Incorporated and Independent Locomotive Service and is headquartered in Crookston, Minnesota.

As of 2006, the Minnesota Northern Railroad employed 11 people and handled approximately 11,000 carloads per year. The primary commodities hauled included grain, seeds, sugar and sugar by-products, coal, animal feeds, and fertilizers.

The Minnesota Northern Railroad interchanges with the BNSF Railway, the Canadian Pacific Railway, and the Northern Plains Railroad.

History

The Minnesota Northern Railroad was created in December 1996 when the railroad’s former owner, RailAmerica, purchased  of track from the newly created Burlington Northern & Santa Fe Railway.

The  of track initially sold to the Minnesota Northern Railroad consisted of:
 A  portion of the P Line Subdivision from Perley, Minnesota to Crookston, Minnesota
 The  Fertile Subdivision from Crookston, Minnesota to Fertile, Minnesota
 The  Ada Subdivision from Crookston, Minnesota to Ada, Minnesota
 The  Warroad Subdivision from St. Hilaire, Minnesota to Warroad, Minnesota
 A  spur of the Grand Forks Subdivision from Tilden Junction, Minnesota to Red Lake Falls, Minnesota.

Shortly after the Minnesota Northern Railroad acquired its track, it abandoned the dilapidated Fertile Subdivision and most of the spur from Tilden Junction to Red Lake Falls. Later abandonments would include the portion of the Ada Subdivision from Beltrami, Minnesota to Ada, Minnesota, the portion of the P Line Subdivision from Shelly, Minnesota to Perley, Minnesota, and the portion of the Warroad Subdivision from Roseau, Minnesota to Warroad, Minnesota.

Before being owned by the Burlington Northern Railroad, the P Line, Ada, and Warroad Subdivisions were owned by the Great Northern Railway. The Fertile Subdivision and spur from Tilden Junction to Red Lake Falls, meanwhile, had been owned by the Northern Pacific Railway.

The portion of the Fertile Subdivision sold to the Minnesota Northern Railroad was once a part of the Northern Pacific Railway’s  mainline from Hawley, Minnesota to Winnipeg, Manitoba. Though the line was an important route for passenger and freight trains to and from Winnipeg in its heyday, currently only a few portions have been spared from abandonment.  A segment of the abandoned grade between Crookston, Minnesota in the north and Ulen, Minnesota in the south has been converted to a multi-use trail known as the Agassiz Recreational Trail

Ownership of the Minnesota Northern Railroad was turned over from RailAmerica to KBN Incorporated and Independent Locomotive Service in 2001. Both companies are based in Minnesota and also co-own two other short line railroads: the St. Croix Valley Railroad in eastern Minnesota and the Dakota Northern Railroad in eastern North Dakota.

Locomotive and Freight Car Fleet

Minnesota Northern Railroad co-owner Independent Locomotive Service supplies the railroad with a fleet of various locomotives, primarily rebuilt four-axle "general purpose" locomotives and switchers from EMD. The locomotives are sent from an Independent Locomotive Service shop in either Bethel, Minnesota or Holt, Minnesota.

The majority of the Minnesota Northern Railroad’s locomotives contain maroon paint with gold lettering. The colors are reminiscent of the school colors used at the University of Minnesota.

Besides possessing locomotives, the Minnesota Northern Railroad also leases 80 covered hoppers. All other freight cars used on the railroad are supplied by both the BNSF and Canadian Pacific railways.

Stations on the Minnesota Northern Railroad

The Minnesota Northern Railroad owns track that goes through the following communities:

 Badger, Minnesota
 Beltrami, Minnesota
 Climax, Minnesota
 Crookston, Minnesota (Also a BNSF Railway station)
 Dakota Junction, Minnesota
 Eldred, Minnesota
 Fox, Minnesota
 Greenbush, Minnesota
 Greenview, Minnesota
 Girard, Minnesota
 Holt, Minnesota
 Mandus, Minnesota
 Middle River, Minnesota
 Nielsville, Minnesota
 Roseau, Minnesota
 St. Hilaire, Minnesota
 Shelly, Minnesota
 Strata, Minnesota
 Strathcona, Minnesota
 Thief River Falls, Minnesota (Also a Canadian Pacific Railway and Northern Plains Railroad station)
 Tilden Junction, Minnesota (Also a BNSF Railway station)
 Wilds, Minnesota

References

Notes

Sources
  	
 
http://regulations.justia.com/view/119917/

Minnesota railroads
RailAmerica
Spin-offs of the BNSF Railway